The Cassana were a family of Italian Baroque painters of the 17th and early 18th centuries.

Family members included:
Giovanni Francesco Cassana (1611–1691), baroque painter of the Genovese school.
Abbate Giovanni Agostino Cassana (1658-1720), son of Giovanni Francesco
Niccolò Cassana or Nicoletto (1659-1714), son of Giovanni Francesco
Giovanni Battista Cassana (1668-1738), son of Giovanni Francesco
Maria Vittoria Cassana (d. 1711), sister or daughter of Giovanni Francesco